Other Animals is the first studio album by the band Erase Errata, released in 2001.

Track listing
"Tongue Tied" – 1:41
"Billy Mummy" – 1:44
"Delivery" – 1:41
"1 Minute" – :48
"Marathon" – 2:55
"Other Animals Are #1" – 2:11
"High Society" – 2:27
"..." – :53
"French Canadia" – 2:17
"How to Tell Yourself from a Television" – 2:04
"Fault List" – 2:20
"C. Rex" – 1:42
"Walk Don't Fly" – 2:15
"Dexterity Is # 2" – 2:10
"---" – 2:30

Personnel
Jenny Hoyston – Vocals, Trumpet
Ellie Erickson – Bass
Bianca Sparta – Drums
Sara Jaffe – Guitar
Colin Dupuis – additional Percussion

References

2001 debut albums
Erase Errata albums
Blast First albums